Jennie, Jenny, or Jennifer Robertson may refer to:

People
 Jennifer Robertson, Canadian actress, also known as Jenn
 Jennie Smillie Robertson (1878-1981), Canadian physician
Jennifer Robertson (athlete) in 1989 IAAF World Cross Country Championships – Junior women's race
Jennifer Robertson (Quadriga), heir to Quadriga cryptocurrency fund
Jennifer Ellen Robertson on List of Guggenheim Fellowships awarded in 2011

Fictional characters
Jennifer Robertson, character in A Smile Like Yours
Jennifer Robertson, character in The Seán Cullen Show
Jenny Robertson, character in Jenny Robertson, Your Friend is not Coming, story in Free Love and Other Stories
Jenny Robertson, character in Attack of the Herbals

See also
Jennifer Roberson (born 1953), American author
Jean Robertson (disambiguation)